The Royal Australasian College of Surgeons (RACS) is the leading advocate for surgical standards, professionalism and surgical education in Australia and New Zealand.

Known by its common acronym RACS, it is a not-for-profit organisation, supports the ongoing development and maintenance of expertise during the lifelong learning that accompanies surgical practice of more than 7,000 surgeons and 1,300 surgical trainees and International Medical Graduates. In conjunction with the Australian Government, RACS also provides global surgery outreach by supporting healthcare and surgical education in the Asia-Pacific region and is a substantial funder of surgical research.

Leading surgical education and excellence 

The RACS is authorised and accredited by the Australian Medical Council on behalf of the Medical Board of Australia, and the Medical Council of New Zealand to conduct training and education of surgeons across nine surgical specialties in Australia and New Zealand: Cardiothoracic surgery, General surgery, Neurosurgery, Orthopaedic surgery, Otolaryngology Head-and-Neck surgery, Paediatric surgery, Plastic and Reconstructive surgery, Urology and Vascular surgery. Training is administered in conjunction with specialist societies in each of these areas. Successful completion of surgical training with RACS earns the award of Fellowship of the Royal Australasian College of Surgeons, denoted by the letters FRACS.

RACS surgeons are highly qualified specialists and stay up-to-date with the latest developments in their area of skill. They have considerable knowledge and provide the best possible care to their patients.

With a proven commitment to lifelong learning and the highest standards of professionalism, Fellows of RACS offer caring, safe and comprehensive surgical care.

Being a Fellow of RACS (FRACS) requires ongoing learning and maintenance of knowledge and skills demonstrated through Continuing Professional Development (CPD) programs ensuring that Fellows not only maintain competency but also continuously build on and improve their clinical knowledge and skills in order to provide high quality contemporary healthcare to the public.

Fellowship, Specialist Registration, and Misrepresentation 
In Australia, specialist registration with the Australian Health Practitioner Regulation Agency (AHPRA) and Medical Board of Australia as a surgeon is only possible via training with or recognition by the RACS, which has previously sparked controversy over the potential for anti-competitive behaviour.

Procedural medical practitioners with overlapping interests, such as cosmetic doctors, have claimed that the RACS has monopolised surgical training, whilst long-running concerns also exist that doctors without RACS surgical training are misleading and potentially harming the public by representing themselves as specialist surgeons. In Australia, the word "surgeon" alone is not a protected title under law, however misrepresentation as an AHPRA-registered surgical specialist is prohibited.

RACS in the community 
RACS has been an active supporter of community health initiatives for several decades. This support has been enabled through the generous contributions of governments, Fellows, Trainees, IMGs and friends of RACS through the Foundation for Surgery, the philanthropic arm of the organisation.

The Foundation for Surgery supports ground-breaking research to ensure safe surgical practice and assists people to have access to early detection and surgical care when they need it. 

The Foundation has facilitated long-term change by supporting aspiring Indigenous surgeons in Australia and New Zealand and also worked to enhance recognition and awareness of their health needs.

RACS also provides specialist medical education, training, capacity development and medical aid to 18 countries in the Asia-Pacific region. Visiting teams and in-country personnel provide clinical mentoring and education to the national medical workforces and deliver train-the-trainer programs to strengthen the capacity of national health services in the region

Equity and inclusion 
The RACS was rocked by a scandal in 2015 when a Sydney vascular surgeon Gabrielle McMullin claimed during a speech that for the sake of their careers it would be safer for female surgical trainees to "comply with requests for sex from their supervisors" than to refuse and report these requests. She later backed these claims with evidence that she had reported sexual harassment of trainees to the College and that the reports were ignored. The original comments were highly provocative and controversial, but prompted a major bullying and harassment investigation RACS that spanned several years. In 2016, the RACS published an official Diversity and Inclusion plan. Fewer than 15% of active Fellows in surgery in Australia are female with a variety of plans to improve representation.

References

External links
  of RACS
 RACS Foundation for Surgery

Medical education in Australia
Specialist medical colleges in Australia
Medical education in New Zealand
Medical and health organisations based in Australia
Australasian Surgeons
Medical associations based in Australia
Medical associations based in New Zealand
Organisations based in Australia with royal patronage
Organisations based in New Zealand with royal patronage
1927 establishments in Australia